Rosa Furman Epstein (25 October 1930 – 29 October 1999) was a Mexican actress.

Career
Furman was born in Mexico City to Favy Furman Jaitzer of Mogilev, Belarus, and Sulamita Epstein Lamdansky of Visoki-Dvor, Lithuania. She was raised in Pachuca, Hidalgo. She studied dramatic arts and English at the National Autonomous University of Mexico.

She began her career on the stage, appearing in plays such as El tiempo es un sueño (1950) and Anunciación de María (1963), both at Guadalajara's Teatro Degollado. After her film debut in the early 1960s, she participated in many popular films and television series. She is remembered for her role as Dorotea "La Cuarraca" in the very prestigious 1967 film adaptation of Juan Rulfo's novel Pedro Páramo. She also received critical acclaim for her performance in the French film Le Rapace (1968), which was shot in Mexico and contains her only starring role. She appeared, albeit uncredited, in the Cantinflas vehicle Un quijote sin mancha (1969). She then played a friend of Shirley MacLaine's character in Two Mules for Sister Sara (1970). In 1972, she traveled to Antonio Aguilar's hacienda in Tayahua, Zacatecas, to play a small role in his film La yegua colorada (released in 1973). She and Diana Ochoa memorably played sisters "La Seca" and "La Meca", two gossipy spinsters, in the comedy La presidenta municipal (1975), starring María Elena Velasco (as La India María), Adalberto Martínez "Resortes" and Pancho Córdova. She had a supporting role in Albur de amor (1980).

In 1997, she received a nomination for the Ariel Award for Best Actress in a Minor Role (Mejor Actriz de Cuadro) for her performance in Profundo carmesí (1996).

Death
She died from cardiac arrest on October 29, 1999, at age 69.

Filmography

 De color moreno (1963) - Aspirante a bailarina
 Viento distante (1965) - Aunt
 Lola de mi vida (1965)
 Amor amor amor (1965) - (segment "Lola de mi vida")
 Pedro Páramo (1967) - Dorotea la Cuarraca
 Domingo salvaje (1967)
 Santo vs. the Martian Invasion (1967) - Esposa en fiesta (uncredited)
 Santo vs. the Villains of the Ring (1968) - Mujer en una sesión (uncredited)
 Guns for San Sebastian (1968) - Agueda
 Le Rapace (1968) - Camito
 Los amigos (1968)
 Un Quijote sin mancha (1969) - Presidenta de la moral (uncredited)
 La maestra inolvidable (1969) - Bruja
 Two Mules for Sister Sara (1970) - 2nd Woman in the Night
 Yesenia (1971) - Trifenia
 Los marcados (1971)
 Pubertinaje (1971) - (segment "Juego de espejos")
 El medio pelo (1972) - Romana
 The Revengers (1972) - (uncredited)
 Mi niño Tizoc (1972) - Turista gringa
 La yegua colorada (1973) - Mujer en restaurant
 El profeta Mimi (1973) - Prostituta asesinada
 Calzonzín inspector (1974)
 Descenso del pais de la noche (1974) - Esposa de Rodrigo
 La presidenta municipal (1975) - Eufracia Mastuerzo 'La Seca'
 Santo vs. las lobas (1976) - Ana
 Celestina (1976) - Alisa
 Alucarda (1977) - (uncredited)
 La plaza de Puerto Santo (1978) - Candida
 La casa del pelícano (1978) - Amelia
 Matar por matar (1979)
 El secuestro de los cien millones (1980)
 Albur de amor (1980) - madre de Alfredo
 Veneno para las hadas (1986) - Señora Krinsky (uncredited)
 Oro, dolor y muerte (1991)
 Profundo carmesí (1996) - Sara Silberman
 Abolengo (1998) - Doña Mercedes
 Entre la tarde y la noche (2000) - Mother Superior (final film role)

References

External links
 

1930s births
1999 deaths
20th-century Mexican actresses
Actresses from Mexico City
Mexican Jews
Mexican film actresses
Mexican people of Belarusian-Jewish descent
Mexican people of Lithuanian-Jewish descent
Mexican stage actresses
Mexican television actresses
National Autonomous University of Mexico alumni
People from Mexico City